Greatest Hits is a compilation album of hits by Dr. Hook released in 1980. The album spent 4 weeks at the top of the Australian album charts in 1981. In 1987, an expanded CD version was released by Capitol under the title Greatest Hits (and More).

Track listings

Original 1980 release
"Sylvia's Mother" – 3:55
"The Cover of the Rolling Stone" – 2:52
"Only Sixteen" – 2:44
"A Little Bit More" – 2:56
"Walk Right In" – 3:04
"Sharing the Night Together" – 2:54
"When You're in Love with a Beautiful Woman" – 2:58
"Better Love Next Time" – 2:59
"Sexy Eyes" – 3:30
"Years from Now" – 3:14

Greatest Hits (and More)
"Sylvia's Mother" (3:52
"The Cover of the Rolling Stone" – 2:54
"Only Sixteen" – 2:46
"A Little Bit More" – 2:57
"Walk Right In" – 3:07
"Making Love & Music" – 2:47
"I Couldn't Believe" – 2:49
"A Couple More Years" – 3:10
"Sharing the Night Together" – 2:57
"When You're in Love with a Beautiful Woman" – 2:59
"Better Love Next Time" – 3:03
"Sexy Eyes" – 3:00
"Years from Now" – 2:58
"The Radio" – 3:31
"Sweetest of All" – 2:39

Charts

Weekly charts

Year-end charts

Certifications

References 

Dr. Hook & the Medicine Show compilation albums
1980 greatest hits albums
Capitol Records compilation albums
Albums produced by Ron Haffkine